Tassos is a Greek male given name, which is a variant of Anastasios and means "resurrection". The name may refer to:

Tassos Denegris (1934–2009), Greek poet
Tassos Isaac (1972–1996), Greek Cypriot activist
Tassos Mantzavinos (born 1958), Greek painter 
Tassos Papadopoulos (1934–2008), Cypriot politician and president
Tassos Venetis (born 1980), Greek footballer

References

Greek masculine given names